The New Zealand Asian Studies Society (NZASIA) is established in 1974. It is an independent academic society that seeks to encourage the spread of knowledge about Asia, its history, its culture, and its role in international affairs. The society publishes the biannual journal New Zealand Journal of Asian Studies and a yearly newsletter. The NZASIA, in cooperation with the Asia:NZ Foundation, offers post-graduate scholarships to support research and fieldwork in Asia.

External links
The New Zealand Asian Studies Society homepage
New Zealand Journal of Asian Studies homepage

Asian-New Zealand culture
Asian studies
Non-profit organisations based in New Zealand